Maithripala Herath (5 June 1928 - 20 February 2015) was a Sri Lankan teacher and politician. He was a member of parliament from Dedigama and Polgahawela.

Educated at St. Mary's College, Kegalle, he went on to become a teacher at Galigamuwa College. He contested the Dedigama, representing the Sri Lanka Freedom Party at the 1956 general election and was elected to parliament. He contested the 1960 March general election and was not successful, polling fourth. He was elected to the Senate in 1956 and contested the 1970 general election in the Polgahawela electorate where he won. He was defeated at the 1977 general election.

He was responsible for the construction of the Home for the Elders' in Nelundeniya and also worked as the Chief Devotee of the Dedigama Rajamaha Viharaya.

References

1928 births
2015 deaths
Members of the 3rd Parliament of Ceylon
Members of the 7th Parliament of Ceylon
Sri Lankan teachers
Sri Lanka Freedom Party politicians
People from British Ceylon